Borgestad may refer to:
, a tettbebyggelse (agglomeration) in the municipality of Skien, Telemark, Norway
Borgestad Manor, an estate and manor house
Borgestad Station, a former train station
Borgestad (company), a Norwegian shipping, industry and real estate company